"Snow Cats" is a song by American rock band AFI. It was released as the lead single from their self-titled, tenth studio album AFI (The Blood Album) in 2016. It peaked at number 39 on the US Alternative Songs chart.

Track listing

Chart positions

References

External links 
Snow Cats Music Video on YouTube

2016 singles
2016 songs
AFI (band) songs
Songs written by Davey Havok
Songs written by Jade Puget